Dowa or dōwa may refer to:
 Dowa, Malawi, a town located in the Central Region of Malawi.
 Dowa District in Malawi.
 The Dowa meteorite of 1976, see meteorite falls.
 Dowa, Nepal, a village development committee in Myagdi District in the Dhawalagiri Zone of western-central Nepal.
 Burakumin, a social outcast group in Japan.
 Dowa Automobile Company, a historical manufacturer of automobiles, trucks and armored cars.
 DOWA Holdings, a Japanese nonferrous metals manufacturer.
 DOWA-IBI Group, part of the IBI Group of architectural and engineering firms.